Nuhu Bamalli (1917 – 25 February 2001) served as foreign minister of Nigeria. Until his death, he was the Magajin Garin Zazzau. 

Nuhu Bamalli Polytechnic Zaria in Nigeria was named after him. It opened in February 1989.

References

Nigerian Political Parties: Power in an Emergent African Nation

1917 births
2001 deaths
Foreign ministers of Nigeria